Carthage was captured by the Vandals from the Western Roman Empire on 19 October 439. Under their leader Genseric, the Vandals crossed the Strait of Gibraltar into Africa and captured Hippo Regius in August 431, which they made the capital of their kingdom. Despite an uneasy peace with the Romans, Genseric made a surprise attack against Carthage in October 439. After capturing Carthage, the Vandals put the city to the sack and made it the new capital of their kingdom.

Background

In Gaul

In 406, the Vandals advanced from Pannonia travelling west along the Danube without much difficulty, but when they reached the Rhine, they met resistance from the Franks, who populated and controlled Romanized regions in northern Gaul. Twenty thousand Vandals, including Godigisel himself, died in the resulting battle, but then with the help of the Alans they managed to defeat the Franks, and on December 31, 406 the Vandals crossed the Rhine, probably while it was frozen, to invade Gaul, which they devastated terribly. Under Godigisel's son Gunderic, the Vandals plundered their way westward and southward through Aquitaine.

To Spain

In 409, Godigisel's son Gunderic led the Vandals across the Pyrenees. They appear to have settled in Spain in two detachments. One, the Asdingi, occupied Galicia; the other, the Silingi, occupied Andalusia. Twenty years of bloody and purposeless warfare with the armies of the empire and with their fellow-barbarians, the Goths and the Suevi, followed. The Silingian Vandals were almost exterminated, but the remains of the Alani, a Turanian people from Iran, marched across Spain and took possession of Andalusia.

Over to Africa

In 428 or 429 the Vandals set sail for Africa, upon an invitation probably received from Bonifacius, count of Africa, who had fallen into disgrace with the court of Ravenna. Gunderic was now dead, and supreme power was in the hands of his bastard brother, Genseric (Gaiseric). Genseric was short and had a limping gait, was reckless with human lives and proficient at war. Probably in the month of May 428 he assembled all his people on the shore of Andalusia which in total numbered 80,000. The passage was carried out Bonifacius's ships. Soon,  Bonifacius, returning to his old loyalty, asked his new allies to return and leave Africa. They, of course, refused, and Bonifacius turned against them, too late. Notwithstanding Bonifacius's opposition, the progress of the Vandals was rapid, and by May 430 only three cities of Roman Africa (Carthage, Hippo and Cirta) remained untaken.

Siege of Hippo and capture of Carthage

The siege of Hippo Regius (May 430 to July 431) ended unsuccessfully for the Vandals. Peace was made on 30 January 435 between the emperor Valentinian III. and Gaiseric. The emperor was to retain Carthage and the small but rich proconsular province in which it was situated, while Hippo and the other six provinces of Africa were abandoned to the Vandals.

Gaiseric observed this treaty until it no longer suited his purpose. On 19 October 439, without any declaration of war, he suddenly attacked Carthage and took it. The Vandal occupation of this great city, the third among the cities of the Roman Empire, lasted for 94 years. Gaiseric seems to have counted the years of his sovereignty from the date of its capture. Though most of the remaining years of Gaiseric's life were passed in war, plunder rather than territorial conquest seems to have been the object of his expeditions. He made, in fact, of Carthage a pirate's stronghold and attacked, in his words, "the dwellings of the men with whom God is angry."

He created probably the only barbarian fleet and was for 30 years the leading maritime power in the Mediterranean. Gaiseric's sack of Rome in 455, undertaken in response to the call of Licinia Eudoxia, widow of Valentinian, was only the greatest of his marauding exploits. He took the city without difficulty, and for 14 days, in a calm and business-like manner, emptied it of all its movable wealth. The sacred vessels of the Second Jewish Temple, brought to Rome by Titus, are said to have been among the spoils carried to Carthage by the conqueror. Eudoxia and her two daughters were also carried into captivity. One of the princesses, Eudocia, was married to Hunneric, eldest son of Gaiseric; her mother and sister, after long and tedious negotiations, were sent to Constantinople.

Gallery

Attribution

References

439
Carthage
Carthage
Carthage
Military history of Tunisia
Theodosius II